St. Otteran's Hospital is a psychiatric hospital in Waterford, County Waterford, Ireland.

History
The hospital, which was designed by Francis Johnston and William Murphy, opened as the Waterford Asylum in 1835. It became Waterford Mental Hospital in the 1920s and went on to become St. Otteran's Hospital in the 1950s. It is named after local patron Saint Otteran. After the introduction of deinstitutionalisation in the late 1980s the hospital went into a period of decline. However, despite calls for its closure, some long-stay residents remain in the hospital and the Health Service Executive uses it as a base to provide social inclusion services.

References

Hospitals in County Waterford
Otterans
Hospital buildings completed in 1835
1835 establishments in Ireland
Hospitals established in 1835
Health Service Executive hospitals